Semisi Tupou (born 29 April 1999) is an Australian rugby union player who plays for the Melbourne Rebels in Super Rugby. His position of choice is centre.

Career
He made his debut for the Rebels against the Jaguares as a replacement for Jack Maddocks in a 29–32 defeat for the Rebels.

Super Rugby statistics

References

External links
 Semisi Tupou - Rugby.com.au

1999 births
Australian sportspeople of Tongan descent
Australian rugby union players
Rugby union centres
Melbourne Rebels players
Living people
Rugby union wings
Melbourne Rising players
Australian expatriate rugby union players
Expatriate rugby union players in Japan
Saitama Wild Knights players
Rugby union players from Brisbane